Alejandro Viñao (born 4 September 1951) is an Argentinian composer currently living in the United Kingdom.

Life and career
Viñao studied musical composition in Buenos Aires with the composer Jacobo Ficher. In 1976 he was awarded a British Council scholarship to study in London at the Royal College of Music and later on at the City University where he was awarded a PhD in composition.  He has been a British citizen since 1994, holding double nationality.
During the 1980s he worked at IRCAM in Paris where he developed a particular interest in sound interpolation (sound morphing) a technique that has featured in many of his compositions such as Chant D'Ailleurs which won the Prix Ars Electronica in 1992.
Viñao has written orchestral and chamber music for the concert hall, opera and music-theatre, film scores, music for multimedia events and rock and popular music. He has also created and presented programmes for the BBC, radio 3.
He has written a number of percussion works, such as Khan Variations for solo Marimba, which have become very well known in the US, Europe and Japan.

At the rhythmic level Viñao's work has been influenced by non-western musical traditions as well as by the music of Conlon Nancarrow. In percussion pieces such as Estudios de Fronteras (2004), Viñao used complex polyrhythms to realise with percussion instruments played by human performers ideas derived from Nancarrow's etudes for pianola. He also explored complex ideas on multi temporality using acoustic instruments combined with electroacoustic means, most noticeably in his string quartet Phrase & Fiction (1994/1995). 
Viñao presented his views on Nancarrow and his influence on a generation of composer such as himself in a BBC radio programme entitled 'Children of Nancarrow'.

Later work by Viñao's focused on social and political issues, writing music-theatre or concert pieces concerned with themes such as the invasion of Iraq (The Baghdad Monologue, 2005), the fate of deprived children around the world (Chicos del 21, 2010) and the financial crisis of 2008 (Greed, 2012).

Viñao lives in Crouch End, North London with his wife, actress Lachele Carl, and their son Matteo.

Prizes and awards
1977 – Cobbett Prize in composition, Royal College of Music, London.
1981 – 1st prize at International Competition for Electro-Acoustic Music, Bourges, France.
1984 – 1st Prize at The International Rostrum of the Unesco World Music Council.
1989 – Distinction, Prix Ars Electronica, Austria.
1990, 1992 – 2nd prize Sony Radio Academy Awards, UK
1992 – Euphonie d'Or, Bourges, France.
1992 – 1st Prize Golden Nica, Prix Ars Electronica, Austria.
1994 – Guggenheim fellowship in composition, USA.
2006 – Leverhulme Trust Artist in Residence at University of Cambridge Computer Laboratory, UK

Recordings 
 Chicos del 21+The Baghdad Monologue  – ArtZoyd/In-possible Records –
 Son Entero/Triple Concerto –  WERGO (WER 2019–50)
 Toccata del Mago –  Computer Music Currents 11 – WERGO (WER 20312)
 Hildegard's Dream –  Musidisc (MU 244942)
 Percussive Counterpoint, label: CAG records
 Voice Stories –   ALBEDO (Catalog no.: ALBCD012)
 United Instruments of Lucilin, FUGA LIBERA, FUG 501
 Vinao, Parmerud etc. "Sthlm Elektronmusikfestival 1981" – Fylkingen Records – FYLP 1026 -
 Miniatures 1 – Cherry Red Records –

References

Further reading
Montague, Stephen. 2001. "Viñao, Alejandro". The New Grove Dictionary of Music and Musicians, second edition, edited by Stanley Sadie and John Tyrrell. London: Macmillan Publishers.
Interview by Philip Tagney, "Alejandro Viñao", Ballade, Nº 3, 1992, Scandinavian University Press, (English).

External links
Personal website of Viñao

Argentine classical composers
British classical composers
Electroacoustic music composers
1951 births
Living people

British male classical composers
Contemporary classical composers
Argentine opera composers
British opera composers
Male opera composers
Place of birth missing (living people)
20th-century Argentine artists
21st-century British musicians
20th-century classical composers
21st-century classical composers
20th-century British composers
21st-century composers
20th-century British male musicians
21st-century British male musicians